Parliamentary elections were held in Iceland on 8 May 1999. The Independence Party remained the largest party in the Althing, winning 26 of the 63 seats. The coalition government of the Independence Party and Progressive Party remained in office, with Davíð Oddsson continuing as Prime Minister.

Results

By constituency

References

Parliamentary elections in Iceland
Parliamentary election
Iceland
Iceland